Aoussou is the period of the year extending, according to the Berber calendar, over 15 days from 25 July. It is known to be a very hot period.

Event 
In Tunisia, the Carnival of Aoussou is celebrated during this period, a festive and cultural event taking place in Sousse.

References 

Berber culture
Tunisian culture
Weather lore